Kevin Zapata Woodhouse (born May 22, 1990) is a Mexican footballer who played as forward. During his career he played for Atlante, Mérida and Puebla.

References

External links
 

1990 births
Living people
Mexican footballers
C.F. Mérida footballers
Club Puebla players
Atlante F.C. footballers
Liga MX players
Footballers from Mexico City
Association football forwards
Association football midfielders